Michael Joseph McDermott (September 7, 1874 in St. Louis, Missouri – June 30, 1943 in St. Louis, Missouri), was a Major League Baseball pitcher. He played three seasons in the majors, -, for the Louisville Colonels, Cleveland Spiders and St. Louis Browns.

External links

Major League Baseball pitchers
Cleveland Spiders players
Louisville Colonels players
St. Louis Browns (NL) players
19th-century baseball players
Baseball players from St. Louis
1862 births
1943 deaths
Minor league baseball managers
Augusta Kennebecs players
Rochester Blackbirds players
Columbus Buckeyes (minor league) players
Columbus Senators players
Syracuse Stars (minor league baseball) players
Springfield Ponies players